MapBasic is a programming language for creation of additional tools and functionality for the MapInfo Professional geographical information system. MapBasic is based on the BASIC family of programming languages.

MapBasic also allows programmers to develop software in popular programming languages such as C, C++ and Visual Basic and use these with the MapInfo Professional GIS to create geographically based software, such as electronic mapping.

References

GIS software
BASIC programming language family